Fredrick Gee (23 June 1872 – 1943) was an English footballer who played in the Football League for Stoke.

Career
Born in Handsworth, Birmingham, Gee joined Stoke from Edgbaston at the end of the 1888–89 season and played in the final match away at Accrington. He played in 21 matches and scored five goals for Stoke before leaving at the end of the 1889–90 season.

Career statistics

References

English footballers
Stoke City F.C. players
English Football League players
1943 deaths
1872 births
Footballers from Handsworth, West Midlands
Association football forwards